Muhammad Hashim Kakar (born 18 September 1963) has been Justice of Balochistan High Court since 12 May 2011.

References

1963 births
Living people
Judges of the Balochistan High Court
Pakistani judges